Dirk Heidolf (born 14 September 1976, Hohenstein) is a German former road racer of solo motorcycles at Grand Prix level. 

His best seasons were in 2002 and 2007 when he finished the year in twentieth place in the 250 cc world championship. He ran his own team in the Moto3 World Championship called Racing Team Germany.

Races by year

(key) (Races in bold indicate pole position, races in italics indicate fastest lap)

References

1976 births
Living people
People from Hohenstein-Ernstthal
People from Bezirk Karl-Marx-Stadt
German motorcycle racers
Sportspeople from Saxony
125cc World Championship riders
250cc World Championship riders